Samuel Ezeala  (born 11 December 1998) is a Spanish-born rugby union player. His position is wing and he currently plays for ASM Clermont Auvergne in the Top 14.

Career
Ezeala made his Top 14 debut in January 2018 against Racing 92 at right wing. He was forced to come off at the 57th minute due to a rough tacle with Virimi Vakatawa which caused him to be knocked out unconscious and sent directly to the hospital. He only played one game that season.

External links
 ASM Clermont profile
 
 ItsRugby profile

References

1999 births
Living people
Spanish rugby union players
ASM Clermont Auvergne players
Rugby union wings